Laetilia melanostathma is a species of snout moth in the genus Laetilia. It was described by Edward Meyrick in 1937. It is found in Argentina.

References

Moths described in 1937
Phycitini